The Pakistan women's national under-20 football team is a youth women's football team operated under the Pakistan Football Federation. The team has so far represented Pakistan at the AFC U-19 Women's Championship and the SAFF U-18 Women's Championship.

History

Current players
The following sqad were called up for recently  ended 2019 AFC U-19 Women's Championship qualification.

Fixtures and results
legend

2018

2023

Competitive record

FIFA U-20 Women's World Cup

*Draws include knock-out matches decided on penalty kicks.

AFC U-20 Women's Asian Cup qualification

SAFF U-18 Women's Championship

*Draws include knock-out matches decided on penalty kicks.

See also
 Pakistan national under-20 football team

References

Asian women's national under-20 association football teams
under-20